Niger State kidnapping can refer to:

Kagara kidnapping, a kidnapping in February 2021
May 2021 Niger State kidnapping

See also
Kidnapping in Nigeria